The Dressed to Kill Tour was the fourth tour of American hard rock band Kiss. The tour was in support of the album Dressed to Kill, and took place in 1975 throughout the United States.

In the tour program for the band's final tour, Stanley reflected on the tour:

Background
When Kiss was the opening act for Black Sabbath at their performances, Ozzy Osbourne recalled: "When the Kiss army was happening, they blew us to smithereens. Pyro? Jeezus Christ, they were unreal. It was frightening going on after them."

Reception
A reviewer for the Oregonian who attended the May 24 performance in Portland gave the show a positive review, stating: "Kiss is certainly a Portland band. Not born in the city, but its appearances have been met with rollicking capacity houses at the Paramount Northwest theater. Well, Saturday night was no exception... There's something going on every minute onstage; not so much the dramatic outpourings of, say, an Alice Cooper, but in the continual interplay between the four members of the group as they utilize the entire stage for their monster-movie shenanigans. And it's all in fun; there's really very little to take seriously in this act. The theater rock effects are handled in a disciplined - if loose - manner while thunderous music practically blows your head away with decibels... Hair flies and bodies shake, and Kiss works to exhaustion. Musically, it's all rock and roll - and loud. Super loud. Extremely loud..."

A Charleston Gazette reporter who had attended the June 22 performance in Charleston had given a mixed review however, and said: "Next to Kiss, Alice Cooper and the New York Dolls make sense. This group of four men, thinks the concert is a costume party and they come dressed to kill. Kiss is weird, but its music is solid rock 'n' roll... It's hard to know exactly what to make of Kiss, this group with the Halloween makeup and exaggerated motions. They sometimes act as if they're not quite sure what their instruments are for, but when they play them, it's obvious they do... They call Kiss the hottest band in America. I'm not sure about that, but they certainly are the weirdest.

Setlist

Songs played overall
"Deuce"
"Strutter"
"Got to Choose"
"Hotter than Hell"
"Firehouse"
"She" Ace Frehley guitar solo
"Nothin' to Lose"
"Room Service"
"Watchin' You"
"Two Timer"
"C'mon and Love Me"
"Let Me Know"
"Strange Ways"
"Rock Bottom"
"Parasite"
Gene Simmons bass solo
"100,000 Years" Peter Criss drum solo
"Black Diamond"
Encore
"Cold Gin"
"Rock and Roll All Nite"
"Let Me Go, Rock 'n' Roll"

Typical setlist
"Deuce"
"Strutter"
"Got to Choose"
"Hotter than Hell"
"Firehouse"
"She" and Ace Frehley guitar solo
"Nothin' to Lose"
"C'mon and Love Me"
"Gene Simmons bass solo"
"100,000 Years" Peter Criss drum solo
"Black Diamond"
Encore
"Cold Gin"
"Rock and Roll All Nite"
"Let Me Go, Rock 'n' Roll"

Tour dates

Personnel
Paul Stanley – vocals, rhythm guitar
Gene Simmons – vocals, bass
Peter Criss – drums, vocals
Ace Frehley – lead guitar, backing vocals

References

Sources

External links
Kiss Online

Kiss (band) concert tours
1975 concert tours